A dessiatin or desyatina is an archaic, rudimentary land measurement used in tsarist Russia.  A dessiatin is equal to 2,400 square sazhens and is approximately equivalent to 2.702 English acres or 10,926.512 square metres (1.09 hectare).

 Treasury/official desyatina) = 10,925.4 m2 = 117,600 sq ft = 2.7 acres = 2,400 square sazhen
 Proprietor's = 14,567.2 m2 = 156,800 sq ft = 3,200 square sazhen

Hence 3 proprietor's desyatinas = 4 official desyatinas.

See also
Obsolete Russian units of measurement

Units of area
Obsolete units of measurement
Russian Empire